In classical mechanics, action-angle coordinates are a set of canonical coordinates useful in solving many integrable systems. The method of action-angles is useful for obtaining the frequencies of oscillatory or rotational motion without solving the equations of motion.  Action-angle coordinates are chiefly used when the Hamilton–Jacobi equations are completely separable.  (Hence, the Hamiltonian does not depend explicitly on time, i.e., the energy is conserved.) Action-angle variables define an invariant torus, so called because holding the action constant defines the surface of a torus, while the angle variables parameterize the coordinates on the torus.

The Bohr–Sommerfeld quantization conditions, used to develop quantum mechanics before the advent of wave mechanics, state that the action must be an integral multiple of Planck's constant; similarly, Einstein's insight into EBK quantization and the difficulty of quantizing non-integrable systems was expressed in terms of the invariant tori of action-angle coordinates.

Action-angle coordinates are also useful in perturbation theory of Hamiltonian mechanics, especially in determining adiabatic invariants. One of the earliest results from chaos theory, for the non-linear  perturbations of dynamical systems with a small number of degrees of freedom is the KAM theorem, which states that the invariant tori are stable under small perturbations.

The use of action-angle variables was central to the solution of the Toda lattice, and to the definition of Lax pairs, or more generally, the idea of the isospectral evolution of  a system.

Derivation
Action angles result from a type-2 canonical transformation where the generating function is Hamilton's characteristic function  (not Hamilton's principal function ). We will not need to solve here for the generating function  itself; instead, we will use it merely as a vehicle for relating the new and old canonical coordinates.

Rather than defining the action angles  directly, we define instead their generalized momenta, which resemble the classical action for each original generalized coordinate

where the integration path is implicitly given by the constant energy function .  Since the actual motion is not involved in this integration, these generalized momenta  are constants of the motion, implying that the transformed Hamiltonian  does not depend on the conjugate generalized coordinates 

Hence, the new Hamiltonian  depends only on the new generalized momenta .

The dynamics of the action angles is given by Hamilton's equations

The right-hand side is a constant of the motion (since all the 's are).  Hence, the solution is given by

where  is a constant of integration.

These  are the frequencies of oscillation/rotation for the original generalized coordinates .  To show this, we integrate the net change in the action angle  over exactly one complete variation (i.e., oscillation or rotation) of its generalized coordinates 

Setting the two expressions for  equal, we obtain the desired equation

The action angles  are an independent set of generalized coordinates.  Thus, in the general case, each original generalized coordinate  can be expressed as a Fourier series in all the action angles

where  is the Fourier series coefficient.  In most practical cases, however, an original generalized coordinate  will be expressible as a Fourier series in only its own action angles

Summary of basic protocol

The general procedure has three steps:

 Calculate the new generalized momenta  
 Express the original Hamiltonian entirely in terms of these variables.
 Take the derivatives of the Hamiltonian with respect to these momenta to obtain the frequencies

Degeneracy

In such cases, the motion is called degenerate.

Degenerate motion signals that there are additional general conserved quantities; for example, the frequencies of the Kepler problem are degenerate, corresponding to the conservation of the Laplace–Runge–Lenz vector.

Degenerate motion also signals that the Hamilton–Jacobi equations are completely separable in more than one coordinate system; for example, the Kepler problem is completely separable in both spherical coordinates and parabolic coordinates.

See also
 Integrable system
 Tautological one-form
 Superintegrable Hamiltonian system
 Einstein–Brillouin–Keller method

References
 L. D. Landau and E. M. Lifshitz, (1976) Mechanics, 3rd. ed., Pergamon Press.
 H. Goldstein, (1980) Classical Mechanics, 2nd. ed., Addison-Wesley. 
 G. Sardanashvily, (2015) Handbook of Integrable Hamiltonian Systems, URSS. 

Coordinate systems
Classical mechanics
Dynamical systems
Hamiltonian mechanics